Zuleima Araméndiz Mejía (born 23 September 1975 in Valledupar, Cesar) is a javelin thrower from Colombia.

Career
Her personal best throw is 59.94 metres, achieved in June 2004 in Bogotá.

Personal bests
Javelin throw: 59.94 m A –  Bogotá, 12 Juny 2004
Javelin throw (old model): 61.72 m A –  Medellín, 4 May 1996

Achievements

References

External links
 
 
 

1975 births
Living people
Colombian female javelin throwers
Athletes (track and field) at the 1996 Summer Olympics
Athletes (track and field) at the 2004 Summer Olympics
Athletes (track and field) at the 2008 Summer Olympics
Athletes (track and field) at the 2003 Pan American Games
Athletes (track and field) at the 2007 Pan American Games
Olympic athletes of Colombia
People from Valledupar
Pan American Games competitors for Colombia
South American Games gold medalists for Colombia
South American Games medalists in athletics
Central American and Caribbean Games gold medalists for Colombia
Competitors at the 2002 Central American and Caribbean Games
Competitors at the 2006 Central American and Caribbean Games
Competitors at the 1994 South American Games
Central American and Caribbean Games medalists in athletics
20th-century Colombian women
21st-century Colombian women